Ricardo Esberad Capanema (19 September 1933 – 10 May 1998) was an international freestyle swimmer from Brazil. At the inaugural Pan American Games in 1951, in Buenos Aires, Argentina, he won a silver medal in the 4×200-metre freestyle, along with Aram Boghossian, João Gonçalves Filho, and Tetsuo Okamoto. At the 1952 Summer Olympics in Helsinki, he swam the 400-metre freestyle, not reaching the final.

References

External links 
 
 

1933 births
1998 deaths
Swimmers at the 1951 Pan American Games
Swimmers at the 1952 Summer Olympics
Olympic swimmers of Brazil
Pan American Games silver medalists for Brazil
Brazilian male freestyle swimmers
Pan American Games medalists in swimming
Medalists at the 1951 Pan American Games
Swimmers from Rio de Janeiro (city)
20th-century Brazilian people